Coca-Cola and Samsung Galaxy Y SoundFest (referred as Coca-Cola SoundFest on the official website or SoundFest Vietnam on the official Facebook) is a music festival first held in Ho Chi Minh City, Vietnam on April 14, 2012. SoundFest has been the largest music festival in Vietnam in terms of the line-up artists as well as the duration time. The 2012 event was sponsored by Coca-Cola and Samsung.

2012
Information on this festival was first revealed in February 2012 by Coca-Cola. Big Bang and Tata Young were the first international artists to be included in the line-up besides the local bands and singers after Samsung sponsored with Coca-Cola. Later, it was revealed that BigBang was paid US$250,000 for 30 minutes at the event. On March 29, Taio Cruz and Kimberly Caldwell were added to the list to increase some more fans to make the event extremely successful, and Audi later joined as the official sponsor for the event. The event was held at Phu Tho Racing Field in Ho Chi Minh City, Vietnam, and the official organizer for this event was Saigon Sound System (after their first and successful Bob Dylan concert held on April 10, 2011 at RMIT). According to the hosts, there were 40,000 people attending SoundFest; however, Caldwell posted on her Facebook that there were 51,000 attenders. Despite there were some small controversies due to the fact several BigBang fans jostled and fainted before and during the BigBang performance at 8pm, including the exhaustion from waiting such under the hot weather for almost 4 hours (1pm-5pm), Soundfest received extremely positive reviews from several audiences, the critics, and the social media, and was an overwhelming success in terms of the first-ever large scale concert in Vietnam after CAMA and Loreto Fest (also Saigon Sound System) The song 'Wavin' Flag' was performed by Phương Vy as part of the interest ahead of the Barclays Premier League finals, UEFA Euro 2012, and the forthcoming London Olympics 2012.

Artists
(In performing order)
Unlimited
Tiến Đạt
Bức Tường
Microwave
Thảo Trang
Hà Okio
Sài Gòn Cafe Sữa Đá 
Turn Your Lights Down Low 
I'm Yours/ Where Is The Love
Nơi Ấy
Như Là Mơ (with N.P. Thùy Trang)
Suboi
Văn Mai Hương
Minh Xù
Phương Vy
Antoneus Maximus
PAK
Big Bang
Tonight
Hands Up
Bad Boy
Fantastic Baby
Lies
Last Farewell
Thanh Bui
Rolling in the Deep (Adele)
U & I
I'm Forbidden
Just the Way You Are (Bruno Mars) (with Tata Young)
Tata Young
Just the Way You Are (Bruno Mars) (with Thanh Bui)
El Nin-YO!
I Believe
Kimberly Caldwell
Desperate Girls & Stupid Boys
Stronger (Kelly Clarkson)
Mess of You
Need You Now (Lady Antebellum)
Say Love
Someone Like You (Adele)
We Are Young (fun.)
Taio Cruz
Hangover
Break Your Heart
Come On Girl
Without You (David Guetta)
She's Like a Star
Little Bad Girl (David Guetta)
Troublemaker
Higher
Dirty Picture
Dynamite (Encore)
Executive Producer: Rod Quinton
Show Director: Joshua Turner

Controversies
SoundFest started at 1PM when the temperature reached almost 40 degree Celsius and lasted for 9 hours, some attenders were exhausted and tired from waiting under such a heat. Pushing and jostling was another problem, especially when BigBang began their performance. Several fans fainted while many fans standing in the front row were pushed to the barriers, some were injured.. The organizer eventually had to pause the band's performance to warn the audience to stop pushing, or else the show would be cancelled. After BigBang's performance, many of the audience left despite the fact that there were still other acts to come.

Reviews
Soundfest is the financial and critical success, calling the festival 'the new generation of music in 2012!'

Future
It is unknown whether the 2013 event will be held. However, during the 2012 event, the hosts stated that if there were no serious accidents in SoundFest 2012, there might be SoundFest 2013. Kimberly Caldwell, DJ Ajam also expressed the anticipation for next year's SoundFest. Recently, Coca-Cola's Zing site as well as SoundFest Vietnam's official Facebook are asking fans which bands they want to perform at SoundFest 2013.

References

Music festivals in Vietnam
2012 in Vietnam
Festivals in Vietnam